Nasiriyah (BGN: An Nāşirīyah; also spelled Nassiriya or Nasiriya) is a city in Iraq. It is the capital of the Dhi Qar Governorate. Its population in 2003 was about 560,000, making it the fourth-largest city in Iraq. It had a diverse population of Muslims, Mandaeans and Jews in the early 20th century; today its inhabitants are predominantly Shia muslims.

Nasiriyah was founded by the Muntafiq tribe in the late 19th century during the Ottoman era. It has since become a major hub for transportation. Nasiriyah is the center of a date-growing area. The city's cottage industries include boat-building, carpentry and silver working. The city museum has a large collection of Sumerian, Assyrian, Babylonian, and Abbasid artifacts. The ruins of the ancient cities of Ur and Larsa are nearby and the Euphrates merges with the Tigris for the final time about 10 kilometres from the city.

Climate
Nasiriyah features a hot desert climate (BWh according to the Köppen climate classification), with mild winters and very hot summers.

Nasiriyah receives  of precipitation annually over 42 precipitation days. Summer is drier than winter, and July and August receive no precipitation at all. The wettest month and the month with the most precipitation days is January, which receives  of precipitation on average over 7 precipitation days.

History

Establishment and Ottoman era

Nasiriyah was founded in 1872 by Nasir al-Sadoon Pasha, the sheikh ("chief") of the Muntafiq tribal confederation, after whom the city was named. During that same year, it became the administrative center of the Muntafiq sanjak ("district"). Nasir Pasha was the head of the Sunni Muslim al-Saadun clan, which was the ruling family of the Muntafiq whose tribesmen were mostly Shia Muslims. At the time of Nasiriyah's founding, Muntafiq power in the Basra Vilayet (southern Iraq) had increasingly given way to Ottoman centralization. However, Nasir Pasha was appointed by the Ottomans as the head of the vilayet (province) and registered large tracts of land around Nasiriyah into his name. His son, Saadun Pasha, became the mutassarif (tax collector) of Nasiriyah, and by 1908, he virtually governed southern Iraq on their behalf, having curried their favor by strongly supporting the 1908 Young Turk Revolution.

It was a major center of trade in Ottoman Iraq and imported foreign goods via commerce with Baghdad and Basra. The chief commodities Nasiriyah produced included leather, grain and ghee. The town contained about 600 well-built stone houses, but most buildings and homes were constructed from mud brick. There were about 350 shops in Nasiriyah as well as five khans (inns). The area surrounding the town was abundant in date palms and grain fields. The town was not protected by a wall like other major administrative centers. In addition to the administrative functions it played for the Muntafiq district, Nasiriyah served as a government outpost and settlement in a generally nomadic region dominated by local Bedouin tribes.

British and Hashemite rule

During World War I, the British conquered the city, controlled at the time by the Ottoman Empire, in July 1915. Some 400 British and Indian and up to 2,000 Turkish soldiers were killed in the battle for Nasiriyah on 24 July 1915.

In 1920, Nasiriyah had 6,523 inhabitants. The population was ethnically diverse with Arab Muslims accounting for 72.7% of the inhabitants, Jews 8%, Mandeans 9.7%, Persians 4.6%, Lurs 4.3% and Christians, Turks, and Indians forming the remainder of the population.

The Iraqi Communist Party's first cell was founded in Nasiriyah by Yusuf Salman Yusuf (known as "Fahd") in the 1930s. It was also the birthplace of Fuad al-Rikabi, who founded the Iraqi Baath Party in the 1950s. At the time, the Iraqi Baath consisted mostly of people from Nasiriyah, namely Rikabi's relatives and associates.

Gulf War

During the 1991 Gulf War, Nasiriyah marked the furthest point to which coalition forces penetrated Iraq, with the United States 82nd Airborne Division and elements of the 101st Airborne Division reaching the main road just outside the city. In March 1991, following the American withdrawal at the war's end, the Shia population of Nasiriyah took part in the revolt against the rule of Iraqi president Saddam Hussein. The revolt was violently subdued by the Iraqi military with heavy loss of life and much physical damage. Many of its inhabitants were massacred by Iraqi government forces.

Until the 2003 Iraq War, Nasiriyah was home to one of the largest communities of Mandaeans in Iraq. In Nasiriyah, Mandaeans mostly lived in the "Subba Quarter", located on the northern banks of the Euphrates River.

Iraq War 

In March 2003, Nasiriyah was one of the first major battles of the 2003 US invasion of Iraq. Phillip Mitchell of the International Institute for Strategic Studies so described the town's strategic importance to The Guardian:

On March 23, the U.S. invasion force was ambushed near the city: 11 US soldiers were killed and Army Private Jessica Lynch, Army Private Lori Piestewa and Specialist Shoshana Johnson were taken prisoners of war during the skirmishes. The Battle of Nasiriyah between Iraqi forces and the 2nd Marine Expeditionary Brigade under the call sign "Task Force Tarawa" of the U.S. Marine Corps lasted between about March 23 and March 29, in which 18 Marines were killed and over 150 were wounded, including a number hit by friendly fire from Air Force A‑10 aircraft, but the Iraqi resistance was defeated fairly rapidly thereafter. The town has been relatively calm since the fall of Saddam Hussein. A truck bomb killed 18 Italian soldiers and 11 civilians in November 2003 (see 2003 Nasiriyah bombing), and clashes erupted here in April 2004.

See also
 Al-Habboubi Square
 Attack on the Al-Habboubi Square (2020)
 Ali Air Base
 List of places in Iraq
 Minorities in Iraq
 Nasiriyah Central Prison
Iraqi conflict (2003–present)

References

Bibliography

External links

Iraq Image – Nasiriyah Satellite Observation

 
1872 establishments in the Ottoman Empire
Cities in Iraq
District capitals of Iraq
Populated places established in 1872
Populated places in Dhi Qar Province
Populated places on the Euphrates River